Marena Whittle (born 28 January 1994) is an Australian professional basketball player.

Personal life
Whittle is currently studying a Juris Doctor at Deakin University.

College
Whittle played college basketball at North Dakota State University in Fargo, North Dakota for the Bison in NCAA Division I.

Statistics 

|-
|2012–13
|North Dakota State
|29
|26
|28.4
|.325
|.250
|.710
|7.1
|1.1
|1.1
|0.4
|1.7
|6.7
|-
|2013–14
|North Dakota State
|30
|28
|28.4
|.407
|.333
|.826
|7.1
|1.2
|1.1
|0.9
|1.4
|13.4
|-
|2014–15
|North Dakota State
|29
|29
|29.9
|.378
|.314
|.714
|7.3
|2.2
|1.7
|1.0
|2.3
|8.6
|-
|2015–16
|North Dakota State
|28
|28
|35.8
|.391
|.333
|.832
|10.3
|2.9
|2.1
|0.9
|3.5
|16.8
|-
|Career
|
|116
|111
|30.5
|.383
|.310
|.784
|7.9
|1.9
|1.5
|0.8
|2.2
|11.3

Career

WNBL
In 2017, Whittle ventured north after signing her first WNBL contract with the Townsville Fire for the 2017–18 season. There, Whittle played under Claudia Brassard, however her season was largely disrupted due to injury and she did not take to the court all season. 

In May 2018, Whittle returned to her home state after signing with the Bendigo Spirit for the 2018–19 season. In 21 games for Bendigo, Whittle averaged 7.2 points and 4.0 assists per game. During the 2019 off-season, she played for the Knox Raiders in the NBL1.

In April 2019, Whittle signed with her third WNBL team in as many years after joining the Perth Lynx for the 2019–20 season. At the 2020 Perth Lynx Club Awards Night, Whittle was recognised as the Most Improved Player for the season. 

In July 2020, after a career-best season in Perth, Whittle signed with the Adelaide Lightning for the 2020–21 season.

References

1994 births
Living people
Australian expatriate basketball people in the United States
Australian women's basketball players
Guards (basketball)
Forwards (basketball)
North Dakota State University alumni
Perth Lynx players
Basketball players from Melbourne
20th-century Australian women
21st-century Australian women